Diplodos is an animated series which first broadcast in 1988. It was produced by Saban International & C&D (Créativité et Développement), a company founded by Jean Chalopin after he left DIC. It is based on the Japanese Pocket Zaurus toyline from Bandai.

Plot 
The series Diplodo focuses on five dinosaur-like creatures, known as the diplodorians. These creatures are from Diplodorianrex, the sister planet of Earth, which lies in the fourth dimension. The story explains that whatever happens to one planet also affects the other planet. The Diplodos have successfully defended their home planet and put up a strong defensive shield. This results in the Diplidos' enemies, led by the evil Santos, targeting Earth in order to destroy the Diplodos' home planet. With this threat, the five chosen Diplodos travel to Earth in order to defend the planet, which will result in saving their own. Here, they meet and become allies with two children, Peter and Joan.

Characters
The Diplodos
Bubbles – A pink hippo-like diplodorian. He is the leader of the Diplodos, he can produce bubbles from his mouth; capable of transporting human beings and possibly an evolved Tyrannosaurus. He is voiced by Arthur Grosser.
Puncher – A purple diplodorian who can punch holes through any material using his teeth and possibly an evolved Heterodontosaurus. He is voiced by Rick Jones.
Scissors – A yellow Pterosaur-like diplodorian who can slice objects using his mouth like a pair of scissors and is possibly an evolved Pteranodon.
Stapler – A blue walrus-like diplodorian who can produce staples from his mouth and is shown to be an evolved Triceratops.
Stickum – An orange Stegosaur-like diplodorian who can produce sellotape from his mouth, useful for repairing holes or tying up enemies and possibly an evolved Stegosaurus.

The children
Peter – A young boy who is an ally and friend to the Diplodos. Peter has brown hair and is interested in dinosaurs.
Joan – A young girl who is an ally and friend to the Diplodos. Joan has blonde hair and enjoys playing soccer.

Enemies
Santos – The evil enemy of the Diplodos. He is an Earthling traitor who works to with the Zodarians to destroy the Earth. He wears a suit of power armour with a laser gun on its wrist. He is voiced by A. J. Henderson.
Zodarians - A species of green-skinned aliens who serve the Great Sorcerer and are commanded by Santos. Like Santos, they wear suits of power armour with built-in laser cannons.
The Great Sorcerer - A powerful villain imprisoned on Diplodorianrex. He can send commands to Santos and the Zodarians through telepathy. He desires the destruction of Earth (and thus, Diplodorianrex) so he can escape and lead the Zodarians to conquer the galaxy. He is depicted as a pair of glowing eyes in the darkness.

See also
DIC Entertainment
Jetix Play

References

1987 French television series debuts
1988 French television series endings
1980s French animated television series
1987 American television series debuts
1988 American television series endings
1980s American animated television series
Animated television series about dinosaurs
Animated television series about siblings
Television series by Saban Entertainment
American children's animated science fiction television series
French children's animated science fiction television series